The Petitions of Right Act 1860 (23 & 24 Vict., c. 34) was an Act of Parliament passed by the Parliament of the United Kingdom that codified and simplified the process of obtaining a petition of right.

Procedure
The Act preserved the right to proceed at common law, but gave an alternative remedy. The procedure was regulated by the 1860 Act, and in England also by rules made under the Act on 1 February 1862. The petition was left with the Home Secretary "for the consideration of His Majesty", who if he thought fit granted his fiat that right be done. The fiat was sealed in the Home Office and issued to the applicant who filed it in the central office of the High Court of Justice, and a sealed copy was served on the Treasury Solicitor, with a demand for a response on behalf of the Crown. The subsequent proceedings, including those as to disclosing relevant documents followed as far as possible those in an ordinary action. A judgment in favour of the applicant was equivalent to a judgment of amoveas manus ouster le main.

Costs were payable to and by the Crown. A petition of right was usually tried in the Chancery or King's Bench divisions but where the subject-matter of the petition arose out of the exercise of belligerent rights on behalf of the Crown, or would be heard in a prize court if the matter were in dispute between private persons, the applicant could at his option start his petition in the Admiralty Court. The Lord Chancellor could direct the hearing of petitions of right in that court even when not started there.

Territorial extent
The Act applied only to England and Wales but was extended to Ireland by the Petitions of Right (Ireland) Act 1873

Repeal
The Crown Proceedings Act 1947 ultimately allowed claims to be brought against the Crown as against any other party and throughout the UK, rendering the Act and process obsolete.

References

Further reading
Digital reproduction of the Original Act on the Parliamentary Archives catalogue

Bibliography

, pp770-771

United Kingdom Acts of Parliament 1860
Acts of the Parliament of the United Kingdom concerning England and Wales
Legal history of England
United Kingdom public law
Acts of the Parliament of the United Kingdom concerning Ireland